Me Mage Sandai (This is My Moon) is a 2001 Sri Lankan Sinhala drama film directed by Asoka Handagama and produced by Upul Jayasinghe for Nilwala Films. It stars Dilhani Ekanayake and Saumya Liyanage in lead roles along with W. Jayasiri and Linton Semage. Music composed by Rohana Weerasinghe. It is the 961st film in the Sri Lankan cinema.

International screening
The second screening of the film was held at the Elphinstone Theatre, at 4.00 and 7.00 pm on 2 August 2001. The film has been screened internationally by winning rave reviews at the Cinefan Asian film festival held in New Delhi in 2001. The film represented Tokyo international film festival which was held from 26 October to 1 November 2001. It also screened at Cheirs Du Cinema, Autumn film festival in Paris as the inaugural film.

Plot
A Sinhalese soldier (Saumya Liyanage) fighting against rebels struggling for Tamil independence is left behind by his company one night. While hiding in a bunker, he's discovered by a Tamil woman (Dilhani Ekanayake), with whom he experiences a violent sexual encounter. She proceeds to follow the soldier after he comes to the realization that his company isn't coming back, and he decides to leave the fighting behind and return home.

However, the soldier's return doesn't bring much joy to his village—his family, who imagined he was dead, was counting on his pension to help them dig their way out of poverty, while his fiancée refuses to have anything to do with a deserter. With no one willing to help him in his village, the soldier finds himself turning to the Tamil woman for affection.

Cast
 Dilhani Ekanayake
 Saumya Liyanage
 W. Jayasiri
 Linton Semage
 Hemasiri Liyanage
 Kaushalya Fernando
 Sunil Hettiarachchi
 Anoma Janadari

Awards
 2001 Singapore International Film Festival 
 SFC Young Cinema Award
 NETPAC/FIPRESCI
 2001 Tokyo International Film Festival 
 Asian Film Award - Special Mention

References

Films set in Sri Lanka (1948–present)
Films about the Sri Lankan Civil War